Bukit Batu is a mukim (subdivision) in Kulai District, Johor, Malaysia. Bukit Batu means "Hill of Rock" in Malay. Kulai Municipal Council administer the town.

History
The village's legend, about hundred years ago, the tiger Kalimantan conquered and chaos this area, and Chong successfully lead a group of villagers to stop and kill the tiger. During WW2, the Japanese conquered this village; with the help of Chong, the villagers survived and successfully stopped the Japanese coming into the village.

Geography

The mukim spans over an area of 86 km2.

Demographics
A mainly Hakka community, the majority of the villagers have the same surname, "Chong". The mukim has 14,147 people.

Economy
Most villagers are oil plantation owners, and most live in bungalows. The richest guy in this village is PK Chong who build up village's economy with plantations and transportation.

Transportation

Road
The town is accessible by bus from Larkin Sentral (2, 888) in Johor Bahru.

References

Kulai District